"All My Friends Are Falling In Love" is a song from English indie rock band the Vaccines. The track was released as a stand-alone single by Columbia Records on 13 November 2018. The song premiered on BBC Radio 1 when it featured as Annie Mac's Hottest Record in the World.

Music video
The music video for the song premiered on 13 November 2018. It features lead singer Justin Young singing along to the song in a club full of couples as the lyrics are shown. The other band members also appear throughout the video.

Charts

References

2018 singles
2018 songs
The Vaccines songs
Columbia Records singles